Soak the Rich is a 1936 American comedy film written and directed by Ben Hecht and Charles MacArthur, and starring Walter Connolly, John Howard, Mary Zimbalist, Lionel Stander, Ilka Chase and Alice Duer Miller. It was released on January 17, 1936, by Paramount Pictures.

Plot

Humphrey Craig is a tycoon who has endowed a university. His idealistic daughter Belinda enrolls there, hoping to get some idea of the 'real world'. When Professor Popper lectures his students on the merits of a 'soak-the-rich' tax bill, Craig (who opposes the bill) gets Popper fired. Meanwhile, Joe Muglia is the leader of a band of radicals on campus. When the radicals protest the dismissal of Popper, Belinda falls in love with Buzz Jones, a radical, handsome idealist .

Cast 
Walter Connolly as Humphrey Craig
John Howard as Kenneth "Buzz" Jones
Mary Zimbalist as Belinda "Bindy" Craig 
Lionel Stander as Muglia
Ilka Chase as Mrs. Mabel Craig
Alice Duer Miller as Miss Beasley
Francis Compton as Tulio
Joseph Sweeney as Capt. Pettijohn
John W. Call as Sign carrier
Edwin Phillips as Lockwood
Robert Wallsten as Tommy Hutchins
George Watts as Rockwell
Percy Kilbride as Everett
Isabelle Foster as Jenny
Edward Garvey as Dean A. S. Phillpotts
Allan Ross MacDougall as Keats
Cornelius MacSunday as Craig's butler

Reception
Frank Nugent of The New York Times wrote, "Collegiate radicals come in for a rather cruel lampooning at the hands of those old die-hards, Ben Hecht and Charles MacArthur, in the antic pair's latest picture, Soak the Rich, which moved into the Astor last night. Their spoofing of youth in revolt is frequently amusing and the quality of the dialogue proves that the premier filmmakers of Astoria have lost none of their wit. The same, alas, cannot be said of their sense of direction."

References

External links 
 

1936 films
Paramount Pictures films
American comedy films
1936 comedy films
Films directed by Ben Hecht
American black-and-white films
1930s English-language films
1930s American films